The 2018 FINA Women's Water Polo World Cup was the 17th edition of the event, organised by the world's governing body in aquatics, the International Swimming Federation (FINA). The event took place in Surgut, Russia from 4 to 9 September 2018.

The United States won the gold medal by defeating Russia 8-5 in the final. Australia captured bronze, beating Spain 9-8.

Format
8 teams qualified for the 2018 FINA World Cup. They are split into two groups of 4 teams. After playing a round-robin every team advanced to the quarterfinals. The best ranked team of Group A played against the fourth ranked team of Group B, the second ranked team of Group A against the third ranked team of Group B the third ranked team of Group A against the second ranked team of Group B and the fourth ranked team of Group A against the best ranked team of Group B. The winners of those quarterfinals advanced to the Semis and played out the champion while the losers of the quarterfinals competed in placement matches.

Groups

Preliminary round

Group A
All times are YEKT (UTC+5)

Group B
All times are YEKT (UTC+5)

Final round

5th-8th place bracket

5th–8th place classification 
All times are YEKT (UTC+5)

7th-place match 
All times are YEKT (UTC+5)

5th-place match 
All times are YEKT (UTC+5)

Championship bracket

Quarterfinals 
All times are YEKT (UTC+5)

Semifinals 
All times are YEKT (UTC+5)

Bronze-medal match 
All times are YEKT (UTC+5)

Gold-medal match 
All times are YEKT (UTC+5)

Final standings

Team Roster
Ashleigh Johnson, Jordan Raney, Stephania Haralabidis, Rachel Fattal, Paige Hauschild, Maggie Steffens (C), Jamie Neushul, Kiley Neushul, Aria Fischer, Kaleigh Gilchrist, Makenzie Fischer, Alys Williams, Amanda Longan. Head coach: Adam Krikorian.

Individual awards

Most Valuable Player

Best Goalkeeper

Best Scorer
 — 19 goals

References

"fina.org September 09, 2018"

F
FINA Women's Water Polo World Cup
International water polo competitions hosted by Russia
Water Polo World Cup
September 2018 sports events in Russia
Women's water polo in Russia
Sport in Surgut
2018 in Russian women's sport